Edmund Andrew Stanczak (August 15, 1921 – May 30, 2004) was an American professional basketball player. He played for the Anderson Packers between 1946 and 1950, then the Boston Celtics in 1950–51. In 1948–49 – Anderson's last season as a member of the National Basketball League – Stanczak led the league in games played (61) and helped them win the NBL championship.

NBA career statistics

Regular season

Playoffs

References

1921 births
2004 deaths
American men's basketball players
American people of Polish descent
Anderson Packers players
Basketball players from Fort Wayne, Indiana
Boston Celtics players
Guards (basketball)
Undrafted National Basketball Association players
Utica Pros players